Buddhism is practised in Africa. Though there have been some conversions amongst Africans, the majority of Buddhists in Africa are of Asian descent, mostly Chinese, Vietnamese, Sri Lankan or Japanese.

South Africa holds the largest Buddhist population in the continent. According to estimates in the 2010s, Buddhist adherents (together with Taoism and Chinese Folk Religion) had been increasing there to between 0.2% or 0.3% of the South African population, or between 100 and 150 thousand people, however, the number of practising Buddhists may be lower.

The African countries and territories in the Indian Ocean also have significant Buddhist minorities. Mauritius has the highest Buddhist percentage (between 1.5 to 2%  of the total population) among African countries due to a high number of Chinese people (nearly 40 thousand or 3% of the Mauritian population). However, the number of practicing Buddhists is only about 0.4, and Madagascar is also home of about 20 thousand Buddhists (or about 0.1% of the total population). In the Seychelles and Réunion, Buddhists represented about 0.1% to 0.2% of the islands' populations.

In North Africa, about 0.3% (or about 20 thousand people) of Libya's population are also Buddhists (mostly foreign workers from Asia). There are also two Buddhist centers in Casablanca, Morocco.

Buddhist centers and temples can be found in Sub-Saharan African countries such as: Botswana, Cameroon, Ghana, Guinea, Ivory Coast, Kenya, Lesotho, Liberia, Malawi, Mali, Namibia, Nigeria, Senegal, Sierra Leone, Swaziland, Tanzania, Togo, Uganda, Zambia, and Zimbabwe.

There have also been cases of some high-profile celebrities converting to Buddhism such as Adewale Akinnuoye-Agbaje, a famous British actor of Nigerian descent.

One of the very few monastics of African descent is Ven. Bhante Buddharakkhita from Uganda, founder of the Uganda Buddhist Centre.

Buddhist population by country

See also
 Buddhism in Libya
 Buddhism in Senegal
 Buddhism in Réunion
 Buddhism in South Africa
 Index of Buddhism-related articles

Further reading
 Clasquin, Michel / Krüger, Jacobus S. (eds.) (1999): Buddhism and Africa. Pretoria: University of South Africa

References